The 1983 Australian Endurance Championship of Makes was a CAMS sanctioned national motor racing title open to Group C Touring Cars. 
The championship was contested over a six round series with all rounds run concurrently with those of the 1983 Australian Endurance Championship.

Holden and Mazda jointly won the championship on 131 points each. Holden had three wins, a second, a third, and a ninth. Mazda won one race, with two seconds and three thirds. Nissan was the only other outright race winner having won the opening two rounds.

Calendar

Class structure
Cars competed in two engine displacement classes:
 Up to 3000cc
 Over 3000cc

Points structure
Championship points were awarded at each round according to the outright position attained by the best placed car of each make:

Results

References

External links 
 Images of the Bathurst round from www.autopics.com.au

Australian Manufacturers' Championship
Endurance Championship of Makes